Hardie Hunter Albright (born Hardie Hunter Albrecht; December 16, 1903 – December 7, 1975) was an American actor.

Early years
Albright was born on December 16, 1903, in Charleroi, Pennsylvania, to traveling vaudeville performers. He made his stage debut in one of his parents' acts at the age of seven.

In June 1926, Albright graduated from Carnegie Tech with a bachelor of arts degree in drama.

Career 
Albright gained acting experience as a member of the repertory company of Eva Le Gallienne. His Broadway debut came in Saturday Night (1926).

He was playing the juvenile lead on the stage in The Greeks when a scout from the Fox Company saw him. He was given a contract and headed for Hollywood. Albright made his film debut in 1931 in John G. Blystone's Young Sinners and appeared in numerous films. He provided the (uncredited) voice of the adolescent Bambi in the Disney film of the same title.

Broadway plays in which Albright appeared included All the Living (1938), Behind Red Lights (1937), Play, Genius, Play! (1935), The Greeks Had a Word for It (1930), A Hundred Years Old (1929), Gang War (1928), The Merchant of Venice (1928), Such Is Life (1927), Twelfth Night (1924), John Gabriel Borkman (1926), The Three Sisters (1926), and Saturday Night (1926).

He retired from film acting after World War II and became a drama instructor at UCLA, writing several books on acting and directing during his time there. During the 1960s, he made many guest appearances on television series such as Hazel, Leave It To Beaver, Bewitched and Gunsmoke.

Personal life 
In 1934, Albright married actress Martha Sleeper. They divorced in 1939. He married actress Arnita Wallace in 1944, and they remained wed until his death.

Death

On December 7, 1975, Albright died from congestive heart failure at Mission Community Hospital in Mission Viejo, California. His ashes were sprinkled at his former vacation site in Lancaster County, Pennsylvania.

Partial filmography

 Young Sinners (1931) as Gene Gibson
 Hush Money (1931) as Stuart Elliot
 Skyline (1931) as John Breen
 Heartbreak (1931) as Count Carl Walden
 So Big (1932) as Dirk De Jong
 The Purchase Price (1932) as Don Leslie
 Jewel Robbery (1932) as Paul
 This Sporting Age (1932) as Johnny Raeburn
 A Successful Calamity (1932) as George Struthers, Peggy's Beau
 The Cabin in the Cotton (1932) as Roland Neal
 The Crash (1932) as Arthur Pringle
 Three on a Match (1932) as Phil (uncredited)
 The Match King (1932) as Erik Borg
 The Working Man (1933) as Benjamin Burnett
 The Song of Songs (1933) as Walter Von Prell
 Three-Cornered Moon (1933) as Ronald
 The House on 56th Street (1933) as Henry Burgess
 The Ninth Guest (1934) as Henry Abbott
 Nana (1934) as Lieutenant Gregory (uncredited)
 White Heat (1934) as Chandler Morris
 Beggar's Holiday (1934) as Dapper Frank Mason aka Bing
 The Scarlet Letter (1934) as Arthur Dimmesdale
 Two Heads on a Pillow (1934) as David L. Talbot
 Crimson Romance (1934) as Hugo
 The Silver Streak (1934) as Allan Dexter
 Sing Sing Nights (1934) as Howard Trude
 Women Must Dress (1935) as David
 Calm Yourself (1935) as Bobby Kent
Champagne for Breakfast (1935) as Bob Bentley - a penniless young lawyer
 Ladies Love Danger (1935) as Phil Morton
 Red Salute (1935) as Leonard Arner
 Granny Get Your Gun (1940) as Phil Westcott
 Ski Patrol (1940) as Tyko Gallen
 Carolina Moon (1940) as Henry Wheeler
 Flight from Destiny (1941) as Ferrers
 Men of the Timberland (1941) as Dudley
 Bachelor Daddy (1941) as Ethelbert
 Navy Blues (1941) as Officer (uncredited)
 Marry the Boss's Daughter (1941) as Putnam Palmer
 Men of the Timberland (1941) as Jim Dudley
 Captains of the Clouds (1942) as Kingsley
 The Mad Doctor of Market Street (1942) as William Saunders
 Saboteur (1942) as Detective (uncredited)
 Lady in a Jam (1942) as Milton
 The Pride of the Yankees (1942) as Van Tuyl
 Bambi (1942) as Bambi Adolescent (voice, uncredited)
 The Loves of Edgar Allan Poe (1942) as Shelton
 Army Wives (1944) as Verne
 Mom and Dad (1945) as Carl Blackburn
 The Jade Mask (1945) as Walter Meeker
 Sunset in El Dorado (1945) as Cecil Phelps / Cyril Earle
 Captain Tugboat Annie (1945) as Johnny Webb
 Angel on My Shoulder (1946) as Smiley Williams

References

External links 
 
 
 

1903 births
1975 deaths
People from Charleroi, Pennsylvania
Male actors from Pennsylvania
Male actors from Pittsburgh
Vaudeville performers
Carnegie Mellon University College of Fine Arts alumni
20th-century American male actors
20th-century American singers
University of California, Los Angeles faculty